Belaya Zemlya (literally "White Land") is a group of three cold, glaciated islands. It is a geographical subgroup of Franz Josef Land, Russian Federation.

History
This area was named Hvidtenland (Norwegian: "White Land") by Fridtjof Nansen, who reached this desolate place on August 5, 1895 during his polar expedition. In his map he drew four islands. Since the limit of permanent ice crosses Belaya Zemlya, it is often difficult to distinguish between land and sea. However, as the cartography of the Franz Josef Archipelago became more accurate, it became apparent that it was a group of three islands.

Belaya Zemlya is the point of the Franz Josef Archipelago that Valerian Albanov was trying to reach when he left the Svyataya Anna with part of the crew, but owing to the polar ice drift and the abundance of polynias along his route, he ended up far to the southwest in Alexandra Land.

Geography
Belaya Zemlya is separated from the main Franz Josef group by a  broad strait known as Proliv Severo-Vostochnyy. The strait running through Belaya Zemlya is called Proliv Sarsa, named after Michael Sars.

Islands
 Eva Island (Остров Ева-Лив), or "Eva-Liv Island", as it includes the Liv Peninsula. With  in length, this is the largest island of the group. Eva Island was named after Fridtjof's wife Eva Nansen (died in 1907). The island is completely covered by two ice domes.
 Adelaide Island (Остров Аделаиды). Only  in length, this is a very small island. Adelaide Island was named by Nansen, after his mother Adelaide Wedel-Jarlsberg.
 Freeden Island (Остров Фреден), sometimes also spelt "Fryeden" because of the transliteration from the Russian. Freeden Island was named by Julius Payer after Wilhelm von Freeden.

See also 
 Geography of Franz Josef Land
 List of islands of Russia

References

External links 
Fridtjof Nansen's early map
Islands
 Eva Nansen 
 :ru:Список островов России Names in Russian

Islands of Franz Josef Land